Alphonse-Marie Kadege is a Burundian politician. He was Vice-President of Burundi from 30 April 2003 to 11 November 2004. He is an ethnic Tutsi and a member of the Union for National Progress (UPRONA) Party. On January 15, 2007, he was acquitted on charges of plotting a coup, along with former president Domitien Ndayizeye and three others; two others were sentenced to long prison terms. On 19 October 2020 the Supreme Court of Burundi sentenced him to prison for involvement in the murder of President Melchior Ndadaye in 1993.

References

Year of birth missing (living people)
Living people
Tutsi people
Union for National Progress politicians
Vice-presidents of Burundi
Heads of government who were later imprisoned